The X-Babies are a group of fictional characters appearing in American comic books published by Marvel Comics. They are depicted as being Mojo-manufactured child clones of the X-Men. They first appeared in Uncanny X-Men Annual #12 and were created by Chris Claremont and Art Adams.

Appearances
In Uncanny X-Men Annual #10 (also by Chris Claremont and Art Adams), Mojo had de-aged the X-Men (Nightcrawler, Shadowcat, Wolverine, Rogue, Magneto, Psylocke, Colossus, Storm and Longshot) into children; this is what most likely inspired the creation of the X-Babies.

In Uncanny X-Men Annual #12, the X-Men are assumed to be dead (having died in Dallas, only to be resurrected by the goddess Roma). Mojo, missing his greatest rating generators, had his people try to recreate his own version of the X-Men. After many unsuccessful attempts, the X-Babies were created. They soon rebel against Mojo. Mojo was about to kill them when he was told that their instant ratings were the highest ever recorded.

There have been several incarnations of the X-Babies over the years, usually resembling whatever the current team of X-Men is. There has also been a similar team instead based on the Avengers, called the Mitey 'Vengers, who appeared in the X-Babies Reborn one-shot. There have also been several X-Babies villain teams including the "Brotherhood of Bullies" based on the Brotherhood of Mutants (X-Babies Murderama, 1998).

In Excalibur: Mojo Mayhem (1989), Kitty Pryde, interrupted on a train trip, helps a team of X-Babies flee from a Mojo enforcer who is intent on getting them back by tricking them into signing contracts. In this incarnation, the children's childlike faults and crushes on each other are cruelly exploited by their adversary. Kitty, with backup, ends up saving the day.

Several incarnations of the X-Babies are friendly with Ricochet Rita, the good past-self of the villain Spiral. Due to Spiral's time travel abilities, Rita, the babies and Spiral can all exist at the same period simultaneously.

In X-Men #46-47 (1995), an X-Babies team is on the run from Mojo's hunters. Gambit and Bishop try to keep them alive. 

In Exiles #8, it is shown that the reality-hopping Exiles encountered a version of the X-Babies.  It is not stated whether these X-Babies are the creation of Mojo or the X-Men of the reality in question.  In fact, no further details are given except for the narrative commentary "The less said about this, the better." The X-Baby Wolvie would then become a permanent member.

Dazzler would encounter juvenile versions of the four main villains from the Age of Apocalypse timelines. These entities would cause major death and destruction throughout Mojoworld.

The X-Men were once again reduced to infancy by Mojo during Uncanny X-Men #461 (2005). As kids, they were able to defeat the villains, parody lawyer-versions of the Exiles. and restore their rightful ages. Juggernaut had second thoughts about returning to adulthood but was convinced to go through with it.

In the X-Babies four issue limited series (2009/2010) the X-Babies discover their position as Mojo's number one rating grabber had been usurped by the newer, cuter, but more shallow in personality 'Adorable X-Babies.'

As a tie-in to the Avengers Vs. X-Men event, a spoof comic called A-Babies Vs. X-Babies #1 (2012) has been released.

Influences
In line with Mojo being a parody of network executives, the X-Babies parody the modern trend of creating younger and junior versions of cartoon characters which began in the 1980s with Jim Henson's Muppet Babies. In comics, Superbaby and Wonder Tot had appeared in Superboy and Wonder Woman comics from the 1950s and 1960s respectively.

Members

Current members
Colossus
Creepy Crawler
Cyke
Shadowkitty
Psychild
Shower
Sugah
Wolvie

Former members
Archangel*
Bishop*
Boyo
Charlie X
Dazzler*
Gambit*
Havok*
Iceman*
Longshot*

* Those without nicknames sometimes were referred to with "Lil'" in front of their names.

Bibliography
Uncanny X-Men Annual #10 (1986) - Note: This is the X-Men team reduced to children
Uncanny X-Men Annual #12 (1988)
Excalibur: Mojo Mayhem (1989)
Uncanny X-Men Annual #17 (1993)
X-Men #46-47 (1995)
Wolverine Special Vol. 1 #102.5 (1996)X-Babies: Murderama (1998)X-Babies: Reborn (2000)Uncanny X-Men #393 (2001)X-Men Unlimited #32 (2001)X-Men Unlimited #37 (2002)Exiles #8 (2002)X-Men Unlimited #50 (2003)Uncanny X-Men #461 (2005) - Note: This is the X-Men team reduced to childrenX-Babies #1 - #4 (2009)A-Babies Vs. X-Babies #1 (2012)
 Spider-Man and the X-Men'' #3 (2015)

See also
Super Jrs.
Tiny Titans

References

External links 
 

Marvel Comics superhero teams
Characters created by Chris Claremont